Material Issue was an American power pop trio from Chicago, Illinois. The band's trademark is pop songs with themes of love and heartbreak. A number of their song titles used girls' first names.

History
Material Issue was formed in 1985, led by frontman Jim Ellison, who played guitar, sang lead vocals, and wrote most of the band's songs. Ellison met bassist Ted Ansani while both were attending Columbia College Chicago in 1986. Drummer Mike Zelenko was found through an ad in the Illinois Entertainer later that year.

In 1987, Material Issue released an eponymous EP on their own label, Big Block. The label operated out of Ellison's bedroom at his parents' home in Addison, Illinois, and was named for the big block engines of the 1970s muscle cars Ellison loved. In 1988, their song "Sixteen Tambourines" appeared on CMJ New Music Report'''s compilation and their music was described by CMJ as a "hooky brand of high-powered psycho-pop". In 1989, Material Issue released the single "Renee Remains The Same", which received heavy airplay around Chicago.

Over the next two years, the band toured extensively across the Midwest and recorded what would become their debut album International Pop Overthrow. The album was a compilation of various demos recorded between roughly 1988 and 1991 and produced by Jeff Murphy from the Chicago-area power pop band Shoes, and recorded at Short Order Recorder, their studio in Zion, Illinois. The album was released nationally in early 1991 and sold over 300,000 copies for Mercury Records. Their debut video for the single "Diane" appeared on MTV's 120 Minutes in late December 1990. International Pop Overthrow had extensive national exposure with "Valerie Loves Me" and "Diane" and music critic Jae-Ha Kim declared "Simple Minds upstaged by Material Issue".

The band's follow up album, 1992's Destination Universe, was also produced by Jeff Murphy at Short Order Recorder, and included the single "What Girls Want" in addition to ballads such as "Next Big Thing" and "Everything". Material Issue continued to tour heavily across the country in support of both albums. The new album was not as well received by critics, nor did it sell as well as their first.

1994's Freak City Soundtrack featured the single "Kim The Waitress", a cover of a 1980s single by The Green Pajamas, and written by Jeff Kelly. Freak City Soundtrack sold fewer than 50,000 copies and Material Issue, feeling left behind by their label, parted ways with Mercury in early 1995.

Material Issue continued touring, selling out venues throughout the upper Midwest. In the summer of 1995 the band co-headlined the first Edgefest festival in Somerset, Wisconsin. In 1995, the group, with Liz Phair, recorded a cover of "The Tra La La Song" for the tribute album Saturday Morning: Cartoons' Greatest Hits, produced by Ralph Sall for MCA Records. Throughout the remainder of 1995 and into 1996, Material Issue recorded a set of new songs with the intention of shopping them to a new label. However, Ellison committed suicide on June 20, 1996 by carbon monoxide poisoning in his garage. A suicide note was found by police, the contents of which were not released publicly. The recordings from 1995 and 1996 were released posthumously on Telecommando Americano in 1997 by Rykodisc as the final Material Issue release, along with the band's six-song debut EP from 1987 as a bonus.

Legacy
The legacy of Material Issue lives on in the International Pop Overthrow festival that plays in Los Angeles, New York City and Chicago each year.  The IPO festival (renamed IPO from Poptopia in the late 90s to honor Material Issue) is the largest showcase of power pop music in the United States and brings in power pop bands from all over the world to showcase what is new in the world of power pop music.

Ted Ansani continues to work in the music business in Chicago and had played bass for several post-Material Issue projects and released his own solo EP in 2000 called Throttle and Pistons - The Ted Ansani Project.  He has made several solo appearances in the last few years in and around Chicago and has also played the IPO festival when it has come to Chicago.  His website carries the banner of the Material Issue legacy which reminds readers of Material Issue's place in rock history.  Ansani is married with three children.

Mike Zelenko continues to play drums and has also played with several current Material Issue projects.  He has drummed for Green, the Darlings  and most recently Zelenko has been playing with a new power pop band from Chicago called The Ladies and Gentlemen.

In 2002, the song "Everything", from the Destination Universe album, was covered by the band Stereo Fuse and received moderate airplay on alternative radio.

The Tragically Hip song "Escape Is At Hand For The Travellin' Man", from the album Phantom Power, is a tribute to Ellison.

Australian power pop band the Pyramidiacs also released a tribute song to Ellison, entitled "Jim", on their 1997 album Teeter Totter.

Original drummer Danny Thompson is currently playing for punk rock band Face to Face and metal band the Uprising. The original bassist, Lance Tawzer, went on to form The Lupins (RCA Records) and wrote a song for the movie Dumb and Dumber; he married Q101 (WKQX) DJ Samantha James and they have two children.

In 2018, it was announced via Facebook that a feature-length documentary was in production with the band as the subject. The film entered post-production in August 2019. It is set to come out within the first half of 2021. The documentary will feature people like Rick Nielsen, Jeff Kwatinetz, Matt Pinfield, Steve Albini, Mike Chapman, and the original members of the band.

Material reissue
In 2011, to commemorate the 20th anniversary of the International Pop Overthrow album, the two surviving members, Mike Zelenko and Ted Ansani, reformed the band under the name Material Reissue.  Chicago based singer-songwriter Phil Angotti (who had recorded as The Idea) joined them, filling in for Jim Ellison.  The show was  part of the International Pop Overthrow festival, named after the album, and took place at the Abbey Pub in Chicago on April 23, 2011.  Material Reissue then performed at the Taste of Chicago on June 28, 2011, at Summerfest in Milwaukee on July 8, 2011, and Lincoln Hall on September 17, 2011.  They performed in what was billed as their final show ever on December 31 at Reggie's Rock Club. However the band has continued to perform live occasionally since that time.International Pop Overthrow was also re-issued in a 20th Anniversary edition.

 Discography 

AlbumsInternational Pop Overthrow (1991)Destination Universe (1992)Freak City Soundtrack (1994)Telecommando Americano (1997)

EPsMaterial Issue (Big Block/Landmine) (1987)Blockbuster (Mercury) (1991)

LiveGoin' Through Your Purse : Live (2400 Troublemakers Can't Be Wrong (1994) album

Singles

"Goin' Through Your Purse" charted on the Radio and Records Alternative chart, peaking at #30 in September 1994.
Compilations
 The Best Of Material Issue (Mercury) (2006)

Compilation appearances

Video appearances

 Rockin' Tonight DVD-V/PAL (MCP Sound & Media) (2005) - "What Girls Want"
 Hard 'N' Heavy DVD-V (Delta Entertainment) (2006) - "What Girls Want"
 Rockin' Avantgarde'' DVD-V/PAL (Delta Entertainment) (2006) - "What Girls Want"

References

Further reading 
 "International Pop Overthrow (Revised Edition): An Ode to the Golden Triangle of Power Pop - Material Issue" by Jim Hoffmann, Susquehanna Road Publishing, 2015, 774 pps.

External links 
 Material Issue fansite (static since 1998)
 Material Issue Page on Yahoo!
 CenterStage Chicago
 Trouser Press

Musical groups from Chicago
American power pop groups
Musical groups established in 1985
Mercury Records artists
Pop punk groups from Illinois
Rykodisc artists
1985 establishments in Illinois